The 1998 Cal Poly Mustangs football team represented California Polytechnic State University during the 1998 NCAA Division I-AA football season.

Cal Poly competed as an NCAA Division I-AA independent in 1998. The Mustangs were led by second-year head coach Larry Welsh and played home games at Mustang Stadium in San Luis Obispo, California. In a big drop-off from their 10 win season in 1997, the 1998 Mustangs finished the season with a record of three wins and eight losses (3–8). Overall, the team was outscored by its opponents 226–299 for the season.

Schedule

Notes

References

Cal Poly
Cal Poly Mustangs football seasons
Cal Poly Mustangs football